The Brighton and Rottingdean Seashore Electric Railway was a unique coastline railway in Brighton, England, that ran through the shallow coastal waters of the English Channel between 1896 and 1901. It was designed by Magnus Volk to extend his Volk's Electric Railway from its terminus in Paston Place to the village of Rottingdean and avoid difficult terrain. While the unique railway was popular and carried tens of thousands of passengers, it was ultimately abandoned to make room for new sea defences, and Volk was unable to raise the funds to construct a replacement.

Background and construction

Magnus Volk, its owner, designer and engineer, had already been successful with the more conventional Volk's Electric Railway, which had then not been extended east of Paston Place. With unfavourable geography in that area, Volk decided to construct a line through the surf from a pier at Paston Place to one at Rottingdean. This was also home to Volk's Seaplane Station which was used by his son George Herbert Volk.

The railway itself consisted of two parallel  gauge tracks, billed as  gauge, the measurement between the outermost rails. The tracks were laid on concrete sleepers mortised into the bedrock. The single car used on the railway was a  pier-like building which stood on four -long legs. Rod-operated brakes were fitted to the other two bogies. The controls were on the upper promenade deck (the railed enclosure surrounding the skylight of the passenger saloon). Although originally intended to be powered by accumulators, electricity was supplied by two overhead lines suspended alongside the tracks; initially only one wire had been used, with an earth return through the rails (or the sea itself at high tide). The power station, beneath the pier at Rottingdean, was equipped with a  steam engine from William Sissons and Co. of Gloucester driving a 50 kW dynamo at 500 volts. It was officially named Pioneer, but many called it Daddy Long-Legs. Due to regulations then in place, a qualified sea captain was on board at all times, and the car was provided with lifeboats and other safety measures.

Construction took two years from 1894 to 1896. The railway officially opened on 28 November 1896, but was nearly destroyed by a storm the night of 4 December. Volk immediately began rebuilding the railway, including the Pioneer, which had been knocked on its side. Pioneer was salvaged and brought ashore, and rebuilt with the legs two feet higher than the previous design. After repairs to Pioneer and the railway were complete, service resumed on 20 July 1897. By the end of that year, 44,282 passengers had travelled on Volk's "Sea Voyage on Wheels".

In use
The railway was popular, but encountered difficulties. The car was slowed considerably at high tide, but Volk could never afford to improve the motors. In 1900, groynes built near the railway were found to have led to underwater scouring under the sleepers and the railway was closed during portions of July and August of that year while this was repaired. Immediately afterwards, the council decided to build a beach protection barrier, which required Volk to divert his line around the barrier. Without funds to do so, Volk closed the railway.

In 1901 the right-of-way was broken up for construction of the barrier. One further attempt was made to raise money for a conventional over-water viaduct along roughly the same route, but Volk was unable to gather enough funds and nothing came of this.

Legacy

The track, car and other structures were sold for scrap but, some of the concrete sleepers can still be viewed at low tide. Eventually Volk's Electric Railway was extended onshore, covering a portion of the same distance; it remains in operation.

A model of the railway car is on display (along with a poster for the railway) in the foyer of the Brighton Toy and Model Museum.

Similar forms of transport

On rails
St. Malo, France, between 1873 and 1923 had a  single-track railway across the harbour, running on submerged rails, bearing a strong resemblance to Volk's Pioneer. The vehicle was cable-hauled rather than self-propelled, however.
Some ferries are arranged to operate on underwater rails; for example, some diesel-powered ferries across the Amsterdam-Rhine Canal in The Netherlands.
Several theme-park attractions, including the Mark Twain Riverboat at Disneyland, feature vehicles guided by submerged rails or guideways.

Other
Sea tractor, a motor vehicle that can travel through shallow water, with driver and passengers on a raised platform.

References

External links

 Pioneer Illustration Highly detailed illustration of the Pioneer tramcar, by Conor Gorman
 The Volks Electric Railway Association, with some information about 'Daddy Long Legs'
 Daddy Longlegs Illustrated feature on Volk's Brighton to Rottingdean Seashore Electric railway with 3D animation
 Daddy Longlegs by John Roles, Brighton Museum
 Daddy Longlegs Photo by Dmitry Karpenko 
  illustrated description of the railway
 Location of the line in OpenStreetMap

Closed railway lines in South East England
Transport in Brighton and Hove
Railway lines opened in 1896
Railway companies disestablished in 1901